is a Japanese footballer who plays as a left back for JFL club Kōchi United SC, on loan from Urawa Reds.

Career statistics

Club
.

References

External links

2002 births
Living people
Association football people from Miyazaki Prefecture
Japanese footballers
Japan youth international footballers
Association football defenders
Urawa Red Diamonds players
SC Sagamihara players
Kochi United SC players